, sometimes referred to as , is a generalist radio station based in Chambéry. The radio station serves the departments of Savoie and Haute-Savoie, though it can also be received as far as Geneva, Lyon, and in parts of Drome, Isére, Jura and Saône-et-Loire.

History 
Radio France Savoie was started in 1988. After an expansion to its coverage area, it was renamed Radio France Pays de Savoie and then folded into the new France Bleu network in 2000.

Transmitters 
France Bleu Pays Savoie broadcasts on the FM band using the following frequencies, as determined by the CSA:

In Savoie:

 Chambéry - Aix-les-Bains: 103.9 MHz
 Albertville: 103.9 MHz
 La Rochette: 106.2 MHz
 Aiguebelle: 104.1 MHz
 Epierre: 105.3 MHz
 La Chambre: 103.9 MHz
 Saint-Jean-de-Maurienne: 103.6 MHz
 Saint-Michel-de-Maurienne: 103.8 MHz
 Modane: 103.6 MHz
 Bessans: 106.1 MHz
 Aussois: 105.6 MHz
 Lanslebourg-Mont-Cenis: 97.2 MHz
 Le Châtelard: 88.8 MHz
 Ecole: 93.7 MHz

In Haute-Savoie :

 Annecy: 95.2 MHz
 Chamonix-Mont-Blanc: 100.5 MHz
 Cluses: 107.3 MHz
 Combloux: 105.9 MHz
 Megève: 106.4 MHz
 Morzine: 103.6 MHz
 Saint-Jorioz: 103.3 MHz
 Sallanches: 105.9 MHz
 Thônes: 105.3 MHz

In Ain :

 Belley: 103.9 MHz
 Gex: 106.1 MHz
 Oyonnax: 102.6 MHz

France Bleu Pays de Savoie also broadcasts using satellite transmission. It uses the Eutelsat 5 West B, which has a coordinate of 5.0°W.

References 

French-language radio stations
Radio stations in France
Radio France
Radio stations established in 1988